Revolutionary People's Party (in Turkish: Devrimci Halk Partisi) is a political party in Turkey, politically close to the PKK. DHP was formed in 1994. It publishes Alternatif.

See also
  Revolutionary People's Party (Turkey, legal)
  Revolutionary People's Liberation Party–Front
  Communist Party of Turkey/Marxist–Leninist

Apoist organizations in Turkey
1994 establishments in Turkey
Communist parties in Turkey
Far-left politics in Turkey
Political parties established in 1994
Kurdistan Workers' Party